Zarubino may refer to:
Zarubino, Primorsky Krai, an urban-type settlement in Primorsky Krai, Russia
Zarubino, Novgorod Oblast, a former urban-type settlement in Novgorod Oblast, Russia; since 2004—a village (selo)
Zarubino, name of several rural localities in Russia